The Adjutant General of Indiana is the commander of the Indiana National Guard, the Indiana Guard Reserve, and, when active, the Indiana Naval Militia.  The Adjutant General (or 'TAG') is responsible for all state, non-federalized military and reports directly to the Governor of Indiana.  Indiana's TAG is appointed by the governor and serves a term concurrent with the governor.  The Adjutant General must hold a rank of Brigadier General (BG) or higher.

There have been 56 men who served as Adjutant General in Indiana; 3 have served nonconsecutive terms, bringing the total number of terms to 59.

List of Adjutants General of Indiana

The following have served as Adjutants General in Indiana:

The following Adjutants General served in Indiana Territory:

Citations and References
Notes

Citations

References

 
 

History of Indiana
Military in Indiana
1817 establishments in Indiana